Émile Dorvilliers (24 March 1890 – 12 May 1970) was a French racing cyclist. He rode in the 1921 Tour de France.

References

1890 births
1970 deaths
French male cyclists
Place of birth missing